NBA Live 96 is the second installment of the NBA Live video game series published by EA Sports and released on November 30, 1995. The PC and PlayStation covers feature Shaquille O'Neal of the Orlando Magic, while the Super Nintendo Entertainment System, Sega Genesis and European PlayStation box covers feature a photo of the tip-off to Game 1 of the 1995 NBA Finals. PlayStation and PC versions are the first games in the series to feature 3D-rendered courts, allowing for multiple camera angles using EA's "Virtual Stadium" technology, which is also used for FIFA Soccer 96. On-court player graphics remain 2D sprites. It is also the first NBA Live game released for the PlayStation. NBA Live 96 is followed by NBA Live 97.

Gameplay
 Live 96 introduces Free Agent pool and Create-a-Player to the series. To meet release deadlines, the latter feature is not included in the PlayStation version.
 This is the first NBA Live title to utilize Virtual Stadium Technology and multiple camera angles.
 Though Michael Jordan and Charles Barkley are not included due to licensing issues, they exist as hidden players in the console versions, which can be unlocked by entering their surnames (along with the surnames of various legends and rookies from the draft class of 1995) in Create-a-Player.

Development
The player sprites were rendered on Silicon Graphics workstations.

Reception
Next Generation{'}s review of the Genesis version praised the game's new features, particularly the post-up move and the create-a-player feature. It rated the game five out of five stars, concluding, "While the action and graphics in Slam 'N' Jam ... for 3DO are still superior, NBA Live '96 for the Genesis is the best basketball simulation out there, anywhere." Next Generation rated the SNES version four out of five stars, explaining that "the game's essential lack of defensive play and offensive strategy make this cart pale in comparison to Genesis' version as a simulator." The reviewer elaborated that players in the SNES version can easily score with repeated dunks and concluded that the game, though the best SNES basketball game yet released, pales against the Genesis version. They later named the Genesis version number 76 on their "Top 100 Games of All Time". Johnny Ballgame of GamePro said the SNES version "is bigger and badder than previous versions on the SNES, and it's the first to be comparable to the acclaimed Genesis versions of the past." He praised the new features, excellent controls, improved graphics, and "jammin' soundtrack". He found the Genesis version inferior to the SNES version with its smaller sprites, fewer colors, and less smooth opening music but still outstanding in absolute terms.

Ballgame stated that the PlayStation version's removal of the create-a-player feature seen in earlier versions of the game, the substandard graphics, and the erratic camera make it an overall mediocre effort. He remarked that this version fails to measure up to NBA ShootOut, which released in the same month. Two sports reviewers of Electronic Gaming Monthly agreed that the graphics were not up to PlayStation standards but maintained it to be the best basketball game on the market at the time, rating it 9.0 and 8.5 out of 10. Next Generation{'}s reviewer praised its vast array of options, features, and plays over NBA Shootout, though he criticized the unrealistic physics. He rated it four out of five stars, concluding, "Even EA admits that as far as technically innovative basketball games go, it's way behind Sony Interactive, Konami, even Crystal Dynamics. But when it comes to gameplay, NBA Live '96 is the most consuming basketball game on the market."

In 1996, Next Generation listed NBA Live 96 as 76th on their "Top 100 Games of All Time" list, commenting that, "none do a better job than NBA Live '96 at managing to balance the offensive nature of the sport while incorporating the important defensive and strategic elements."

References

1995 video games
DOS games
Electronic Arts games
Game Boy games
Hitmen Productions games
Multiplayer and single-player video games
NBA Live
PlayStation (console) games
Sega Genesis games
Super Nintendo Entertainment System games
Tiertex Design Studios games
Video games developed in Canada
Video games set in 1995
Video games set in 1996
Windows games
ru:NBA Live 96